This is a list of Honorary Fellows of Worcester College, Oxford.

Lourens Ackermann
Simon Brown, Baron Brown of Eaton-under-Heywood
Judith Buchanan
Sir Michael Codron
Steven Croft
Russell T Davies
Ben Delo
Anne Desmet
Maria Djurkovic
Sir Simon Donaldson
Sir Terence English
Richard Faulkner, Baron Faulkner of Worcester
Sir Julian Flaux
Sir Peter Gibson
Sir Iain Glidewell
Alec Graham
Andy Green
Sir Jeremy Greenstock
Ravi Gupta
Arthur Hamilton, Lord Hamilton
Helen-Ann Hartley
John L. Heilbron
Christine Holt
Sir John Hood
Alec Horsley
Steven L. Isenberg
David S. Ingram
Sir Martin Jacomb
Elena Kagan
Sir Hans Kornberg
Peter Kosminsky
Haruhiko Kuroda
Muhammad Habibur Rahman
John Sainsbury, Baron Sainsbury of Preston Candover
Peter Vansittart
Leonard Wolfson, Baron Wolfson

See also

 :Category:Alumni of Worcester College, Oxford
 :Category:Fellows of Worcester College, Oxford

Honorary Fellows
Worcester
People associated with Worcester College, Oxford